Craps is the second studio album from Boston indie rock band Big Dipper. It was released in 1988 on Homestead Records. Craps was remastered and re-released in 2008 as part of Merge Records' Supercluster: The Big Dipper Anthology set.

Track listing

References

1988 albums
Big Dipper (band) albums
Homestead Records albums